is a Japanese professional ice hockey forward who is currently playing for the Oji Eagles in the Asia League Ice Hockey.

Playing career
Kuji attended and previously played at university level for the Waseda University. He made his professional debut in the Asia League Ice Hockey with the Oji Eagles in 2010. After five seasons with the Eagles, having recorded a dominant season in 2014–15 with 61 points in just 39 games, Kuji opted to test himself in Europe through securing a try-out contract with top level German club, Eisbären Berlin on July 15, 2015.

Kuji enjoyed a successful pre-season in Germany and on September 9, 2015, it was announced that Kuji had secured a one-year contract to remain for the season with Eisbären Berlin. He had two assists and no goals in 37 DEL games over the 2015–16 season. Kuji scored his only goal for the Eisbären squad in one of his four appearances in the Champions Hockey League. He did not have his contract renewed after the conclusion of the season.

He has also played and is a current member in the Japan national team from 2009.

References

External links

1987 births
People from Tomakomai, Hokkaido
Eisbären Berlin players
Japanese ice hockey forwards
Living people
Oji Eagles players
Sportspeople from Hokkaido
Asian Games silver medalists for Japan
Asian Games bronze medalists for Japan
Medalists at the 2011 Asian Winter Games
Medalists at the 2017 Asian Winter Games
Ice hockey players at the 2011 Asian Winter Games
Ice hockey players at the 2017 Asian Winter Games
Asian Games medalists in ice hockey